Eisenackitina is an extinct genus of chitinozoans. It was described by Jansonius in 1964.

Species
 Eisenackitina barrandei Paris et Křiž, 1984
 Eisenackitina causiata Verniers, 1999
 Eisenackitina clunensis Miller, Sutherland et Dorning, 1997
 Eisenackitina dolioliformis Umnova, 1976
 Eisenackitina elongata Eisenack, 1972
 Eisenackitina inanulifera Nestor, 2005
 Eisenackitina intermedia (Eisenack, 1955)
 Eisenackitina invenusta (Wrona, 1980)
 Eisenackitina kerria Miller, Sutherland et Dorning, 1997
 Eisenackitina lagena (Eisenack, 1968)
 Eisenackitina lagenicula (Eisenack, 1971)
 Eisenackitina lagenomorpha (Eisenack, 1931)
 Eisenackitina oviformis (Eisenack, 1972)
 Eisenackitina philipi Laufeld, 1974
 Eisenackitina rhenana (Eisenack, 1939)
 Eisenackitina spongiosa Swire, 1990

References

Prehistoric marine animals
Fossil taxa described in 1964